The Modula programming language is a descendant of the Pascal language. It was developed in Switzerland, at ETH Zurich, in the mid-1970s by Niklaus Wirth, the same person who designed Pascal. The main innovation of Modula over Pascal is a module system, used for grouping sets of related declarations into program units; hence the name Modula. The language is defined in a report by Wirth called Modula. A language for modular multiprogramming published 1976.

Modula was first implemented by Wirth on a PDP-11. Very soon, other implementations followed, most importantly, the compilers developed for University of York Modula, and one at Philips Laboratories named PL Modula, which generated code for the LSI-11 microprocessor.

The development of Modula was discontinued soon after its publication. Wirth then concentrated his efforts on Modula's successor, Modula-2.

References 

Procedural programming languages
Modula programming language family
Programming languages created in 1975